El abanderado  is a 1943 Spanish historical drama film directed by Eusebio Fernández Ardavín.

Synopsis 
Daoíz and Velarde are two Spanish army captains who die in the 2 May 1808 uprising against Napoleon in Madrid. The historical period is a backdrop for personal drama involving the characters, including a romance between Torrealta, a colonel, and Renata, the daughter of a French general.

References

External links 

1943 films
1940s historical drama films
Spanish historical drama films
1940s Spanish-language films
Peninsular War films
Films set in 1808
Films set in Spain
Films set in Madrid
Spanish black-and-white films
1940s Spanish films